"Pin Heel Surfer" is a song, and the fourteenth major single (17th overall) released, by the Japanese band Scandal. The first track was produced by Triceratops. The single reached #9 on the Oricon weekly charts on its first week and charted for 3 weeks, selling 13,585 copies.

Track listing

References

2012 singles
Scandal (Japanese band) songs
2012 songs
Epic Records singles